In nuclear physics, a beta decay transition is the change in state of an atomic nucleus undergoing beta decay. (β-decay) When undergoing beta decay, a nucleus emits a beta particle and a corresponding neutrino, transforming the original nuclide into one with the same mass, but differing charge. (an isobar)

There are several types of beta decay transition. In a Fermi transition, the spins of the two emitted particles are anti-parallel, for a combined spin . As a result, the total angular momentum of the nucleus is unchanged by the transition. By contrast, in a Gamow-Teller transition, the spins of the two emitted particles are parallel, with total spin , leading to a change in angular momentum between the initial and final states of the nucleus.

The theoretical work in describing these transitions was done between 1934 and 1936 by George Gamow and Edward Teller at George Washington University.

The weak interaction and beta decay

β decay had been first described theoretically by Fermi's original ansatz which was Lorentz-invariant and involved a 4-point fermion vector current. However, this did not incorporate parity violation within the matrix element in Fermi's Golden Rule seen in weak interactions. The Gamow–Teller theory was necessary for the inclusion of parity violation by modifying the matrix element to include vector and axial-vector couplings of fermions. 
This formed the matrix element that completed the Fermi theory of β decay and described parity violation, neutrino helicity, muon decay properties along with the concept of lepton universality. Before the  Standard Model of Particle Physics was developed, George Sudarshan and Robert Marshak, and also independently Richard Feynman and Murray Gell-Mann, determined the correct tensor structure (vector minus axial vector) of the four-fermion interaction. 
From there modern electroweak theory was developed, which described the weak interaction in terms of massive gauge bosons which was required for describing high energy particle cross-sections.

Fermi transition 

In the Fermi transition, the electron and neutrino emitted from the β-decay parent nucleus have spin vectors which are anti-parallel to one another.

This means

   no change in the total angular momentum of the nucleus

Examples

 

 

also  parity is conserved: .

 = excited state of N

Gamow–Teller transition 

In nuclear transitions governed by strong and electromagnetic interactions (which are invariant under parity), the physical laws would be the same if the interaction was reflected in a mirror. Hence the sum of a vector and a pseudovector is not meaningful.  However, the weak force, which governs beta decay and the corresponding nuclear transitions, does depend on the chirality of the interaction, and in this case pseudovectors and vectors are added.

The Gamow–Teller transition is a pseudovector transition, that is, the selection rules for beta decay caused by such a transition involve no parity change of the nuclear state. The spin of the parent nucleus can either remain unchanged or change by ±1. However, unlike the Fermi transition, transitions from spin 0 to spin 0 are excluded.

In terms of total nuclear angular momentum, the Gamow–Teller transition is

Examples

 

   also  parity is conserved:   the final 6Li 1+ state has  and the  state has  states that couple to an even parity state.

Mixed Fermi and Gamow–Teller decay 

Due to the existence of the 2 possible final states, each β decay is a mixture of the two decay types. This essentially means that some of the time the remaining nucleus is in an excited state and other times the decay is directly to the ground state.
Unlike Fermi transitions, Gamow–Teller transitions occur via an operator that operates only if the initial nuclear wavefunction and final nuclear wavefunction are defined. 
The Isospin and Angular Momentum selection rules can be deduced from the operator and the identification of allowed and forbidden decays can be found.

Examples

 

 

or

 

 

The above reaction involves "mirror nuclei", nuclei in which the numbers of protons and neutrons are interchanged.

One can measure the angular distributions of β particles with respect to the axis of nuclear spin polarization to determine what the mixture is between the two decay types (Fermi and Gamow–Teller).

The mixture can be expressed as a ratio of matrix elements (Fermi's golden rule relates transitions to matrix elements)

The interesting observation is that y for mirror nuclei is on the order of the value of y for neutron decay while non-mirror nuclear decays tend to be an order of magnitude less.

Physical consequences

Conservation of weak vector current 

The Conservation of Vector Current hypothesis was created out of the Gamow–Teller theory.  The Fermi decay is the result of a vector current and is dominant in the decay of the neutron to a proton while the Gamow–Teller decay is an axial-current transition.  Conservation of Vector Current is the assumption that the weak vector current responsible for the decay is conserved.  Another observation is that the Fermi transitions illustrate how the nucleons inside the nucleus interact as free particles despite being surrounded by mesons mediating the nuclear force. This is useful in considering the barrier tunnelling mechanism involved with alpha decay and in deriving the Geiger–Nuttall law.

Forbidden decays 

The Fermi decays are often referred to as the "superallowed" decays while Gamow–Teller decays are simple "allowed" decays.

Forbidden decays are those which are substantially more improbable, due to parity violation, and as a result have long decay times.

Now the angular momentum (L) of the  systems can be non-zero (in the center-of-mass frame of the system).

Below are the Observed Selection Rules for Nuclear Beta-Decay:

Each of the above have Fermi and Gamow–Teller decays.

So for the "first-forbidden" transitions you have
 Fermi
and
 Gamow–Teller
systems.

Notice that  (parity violating transition).

The half life of the decay increases with each order:

Decay rate

A calculation of the β emission decay rate is quite different from a calculation of α decay.  In α decay the nucleons of the original nucleus are used to form the final state α particle (4He).  In β decay the β and neutrino particles are the result of a nucleon transformation into its isospin complement ( or ).  Below is a list of the differences:

The β electron and neutrino did not exist before the decay.
The β electron and neutrino are relativistic (nuclear decay energy is usually not enough to make heavy α nucleus relativistic).
The light decay products can have continuous energy distributions. (before assuming the α carried away most of the energy was usually a good approximation).

The β decay rate calculation was developed by Fermi in 1934 and was based on Pauli's neutrino hypothesis.

Fermi's Golden Rule says that the transition rate  is given by a transition matrix element (or "amplitude")  weighted by the phase space and Planck's constant  such that

 

From this analysis we can conclude that the Gamow–Teller nuclear transition from  0 → ±1 is a weak perturbation of the system's interaction Hamiltonian. This assumption appears to be true based on the very short time scale (10−20 s) it takes for the formation of quasi-stationary nuclear states compared with the time it takes for a β decay (half lives ranging from seconds to days).

The matrix element between parent and daughter nuclei in such a transition is:

with the interaction Hamiltonian forming 2 separate states from the perturbation.

References

External links 
 Fermi Theory of Beta Decay 
 Transition Probabilities and Fermi's Golden Rule

Nuclear physics
Quantum mechanics
Radioactivity